Acoustic Vagabonds is an EP by American singer/songwriter and Jayhawks member Gary Louris featuring six acoustic versions of tracks from his debut solo album Vagabonds. It was initially given away in independent record shops with copies of the album but was later released to buy separately on November 3, 2008.

Reception

Writing for Allmusic, critic Mark Deming compared the songs in the stripped-down format of the EP with Louris' versions from the album Vagabonds writing; "These solo performances don't bring much that's new to these songs, but given how good Louris' songwriting was on Vagabonds, that's no insult; accompanied by a full band, they were compelling stuff, and Louris makes them work nearly as well with just his voice and a six-string."

Track listing
All songs written by Gary Louris
 "True Blue" – 5:02
 "Omaha Nights" – 4:04
 "To Die a Happy Man" – 4:34
 "She Only Calls Me on Sundays" – 3:19
 "We'll Get By" – 4:29
 "Vagabonds" – 5:27

Personnel
Gary Louris – vocals, guitar, harmonica

References

2008 EPs
Rykodisc EPs
Gary Louris albums
Albums produced by Chris Robinson (singer)